Franklin Hotel may refer to:

in the United Kingdom
Franklin Hotel, London

in the United States
(sorted by state, then city/town)
Franklin Hotel (Strawberry Point, Iowa), listed on the National Register of Historic Places (NRHP) in Clayton County
Franklin Hotel (Kent, Ohio), listed on the NRHP in Portage County
Hotel Franklin, Mangum, Oklahoma, listed on the NRHP in Greer County
Hotel Ramapo, Portland, Oregon, has been known as "Franklin Hotel" on the NRHP in Multnomah County
Benjamin Franklin House, Philadelphia, Pennsylvania, formerly the Benjamin Franklin Hotel, listed on the NRHP in Philadelphia County

See also
Franklin House (disambiguation)